Clear Fork is an unincorporated community in Bland County, Virginia, United States.

References

Unincorporated communities in Bland County, Virginia
Unincorporated communities in Virginia